Charles DeWitt (1727–1787) was a delegate to the Continental Congress of United States.

Charles DeWitt may also refer to:

Charles G. DeWitt (1789–1839), former member of the United States House of Representatives from New York
Charles W. DeWitt Jr. (born 1947), former member of the Louisiana House of Representatives
Charles B. DeWitt (born 1950), former director of the National Institutes of Justice